Lingala is a village and a mandal in Kadapa district in the state of Andhra Pradesh in India.

Geography
It has an average elevation of 292 meters (961 feet).

Panchayats
The following is the list of village panchayats in Lingala, Kadapa district mandal.

References 

Villages in Kadapa district